The UK Albums Chart is one of many music charts compiled by the Official Charts Company that calculates the best-selling albums of the week in the United Kingdom. Before 2004, the chart was only based on the sales of physical albums. This list shows albums that peaked in the Top 10 of the UK Albums Chart during 1990, as well as albums which peaked in 1989 and 1991 but were in the top 10 in 1990. The entry date is when the album appeared in the top 10 for the first time (week ending, as published by the Official Charts Company, which is six days after the chart is announced).

One-hundred and nineteen albums were in the top ten this year. Fourteen albums from 1989 remained in the top 10 for several weeks at the beginning of the year, or re-entered during the year, while I'm Your Baby Tonight by Whitney Houston and The Singles Collection 1984/1990 by Jimmy Somerville were both released in 1990 but did not reach their peak until 1991. Forever Your Girl by Paula Abdul, Hangin' Tough by New Kids on the Block, Journeyman by Eric Clapton, Labour of Love II by UB40 and Sleeping with the Past by Elton John were the albums from 1989 to reach their peak in 1990. Eleven artists scored multiple entries in the top 10 in 1990. Alannah Miles, Betty Boo, The Charlatans and The Sundays were among the many artists who achieved their first UK charting top 10 album in 1990.

The 1989 Christmas number-one album, ...But Seriously by Phil Collins, remained at number-one for the first 3 weeks of 1990. The first new number-one album of the year was Colour by The Christians. Overall, seventeen different albums peaked at number-one in 1990, with Luciano Pavarotti (2) having the most albums hit that position.

Background

Multiple entries
One-hundred and nineteen albums charted in the top 10 in 1990, with one-hundred and three albums reaching their peak this year.

Eleven artists scored multiple entries in the top 10 in 1990.

Top-ten albums
Key

Entries by artist
The following table shows artists who achieved two or more top 10 entries in 1990, including albums that reached their peak in 1989. The figures only include main artists, with featured artists and appearances on compilation albums not counted individually for each artist. The total number of weeks an artist spent in the top ten in 1990 is also shown.

Notes

 Foreign Affair re-entered the top 10 at number 8 on 3 March 1990 (week ending) for 5 weeks.
 The Road to Hell re-entered the top 10 at number 8 on 17 February 1990 (week ending) for 7 weeks.
 Hangin' Tough re-entered the top 10 at number 8 on 6 January 1990 (week ending) for 6 weeks and at number 9 on 19 May 1990 (week ending) for 2 weeks.
 Like a Prayer re-entered the top 10 at number 10 on 6 January 1990 (week ending) for 2 weeks.
 Club Classics Volume One re-entered the top 10 at number 8 on 20 January 1990 (week ending).
 The Best of Rod Stewart re-entered the top 10 at number 10 on 20 January 1990 (week ending), at number 10 on 3 February 1990 (week ending) and at number 6 on 3 March 1990 (week ending) for 3 weeks.
 Journeyman re-entered the top 10 at number 7 on 27 January 1990 (week ending) for 7 weeks.
 The First Ten Years was a collection released to celebrate Iron Maiden's tenth anniversary. It combined various singles as double EPs which charted individually.
 The Raw and the Cooked re-entered the top 10 at number 9 on 3 March 1990 (week ending).
 Vivaldi - The Four Seasons re-entered the top 10 at number 5 on 5 May 1990 (week ending) for 4 weeks.
 Soul Provider re-entered the top 10 at number 9 on 26 May 1990 (week ending) for 3 weeks, at number 10 on 25 August 1990 (week ending) for 10 weeks and at number 10 on 1 December 1990 (week ending) for 8 weeks.
 The Essential Pavarotti re-entered the top 10 at number 8 on 16 June 1990 (week ending) for 11 weeks.
 Labour of Love II re-entered the top 10 at number 8 on 14 April 1990 (week ending) for 10 weeks and at number 9 on 23 June 1990 (week ending) for 2 weeks.
 Forever Your Girl re-entered the top 10 at number 3 on 12 May 1990 (week ending) for 4 weeks.
 I'm Breathless re-entered the top 10 at number 5 on 28 July 1990 (week ending) for 5 weeks.
 Cosmic Thing re-entered the top 10 at number 10 on 2 June 1990 (week ending) for 2 weeks.
 Between the Lines re-entered the top 10 at number 7 on 21 July 1990 (week ending) for 2 weeks.
 Natural History: The Very Best of Talk Talk re-entered the top 10 at number 6 on 14 July 1990 (week ending).
 Wilson Phillips re-entered the top 10 at number 10 on 8 September 1990 (week ending) and at number 10 on 22 September 1990 (week ending).
 Sleeping with the Past re-entered the top 10 at number 2 on 7 July 1990 (week ending) for 16 weeks.
 Please Hammer, Don't Hurt 'Em re-entered the top 10 at number 10 on 26 January 1991 (week ending).
 Listen Without Prejudice Vol. 1 re-entered the top 10 at number 10 on 29 December 1990 (week ending) for 4 weeks, at number 3 on 23 February 1991 (week ending) for 5 weeks and at number 7 on 30 March 1991 (week ending) for 2 weeks.
 The Very Best of Elton John re-entered the top 10 at number 9 on 6 April 1991 (week ending).
 I'm Your Baby Tonight re-entered the top 10 at number 8 on 22 December 1990 (week ending) for 8 weeks and at number 9 on 23 February 1991 (week ending).
 The Immaculate Collection re-entered the top 10 at number 7 on 23 March 1991 (week ending) for 3 weeks, at number 10 on 20 April 1991 (week ending) and at number 3 on 3 August 1991 (week ending) for 7 weeks.
 Figure includes album that peaked in 1989.
 Figure includes album that first charted in 1989 but peaked in 1990.

See also
1990 in British music
List of number-one albums from the 1990s (UK)

References
General

Specific

External links
1990 album chart archive at the Official Charts Company (click on relevant week)

United Kingdom top 10 albums
Top 10 albums
1990